María Teresa Tula (born 23 April 1951) is a Salvadoran political writer and activist associated with the group COMADRES. This group supports those who have been subjected to forced disappearance or political assassination in El Salvador.

Early life and education
Tula was born in Izalco on 23 April 1951. She was brought up by her grandmother and attended school for less than two years before she had her first child at fifteen whilst she was living with her brothers, sisters and step-siblings.

Activism

El Salvador
She met José Rafael Canales Guevara who was a blacksmith when she was sixteen. Guevara was arrested for organising workers against their employers. Tula joined the group called COMADRES which created protests against the government. Comadres had been set up with the support of Archbishop Romero and it was a support group for the relatives of those who were forcibly disappeared or killed. Romero was himself killed in 1980 as was Tula's husband. Tula's husband's body was found with a bullet wound to his head two days after people, who said they were the police, took him away to help with a robbery enquiry. Tula's husband was said to have been a witness to the crime. Friends said that she should not reclaim her husband's body but Tula defied their advice. 1980 was the year that the government and the opposition became entrenched. The political and military opposition were subject to the death squads who killed 1000 people per month. After the death of her husband, Tula worked full-time for COMADRES, who themselves became a target. Some of her fellow activists were captured and killed, but COMADRES did not shy away from controversy and their workers visited dumps to photograph bodies so that families would know the fate of the "disappeared". Tula was given a specific warning of her own fate by an escaped prisoner of the government.

Mexico
Tula left for Mexico with her four children in 1982 where she continued her activism in Mexico City. Tula's resolution was strengthened in 1984 when her organisation was given the Robert F. Kennedy Center for Justice and Human Rights Award. This award is given to those who show courage and have made a significant contribution to human rights in their country. Up to 1985 she toured Canada and Europe talking to feminists and others about the cause. She visited at least eight countries and during this journey she realised how the ideas of feminism could be used in her country.

Return to El Salvador
Tula was tortured and raped after she returned to her home country in 1986. She had returned to work for COMADRES and she was released after four months due to international pressure which highlighted her mistreatment.

United States
In 1987, she arrived in the United States where she was again subject to politics. She applied for political asylum but this took seven years to achieve. The American government was supporting the government in El Salvador and although she had the personal support of dozens of senators she found herself accused of being a terrorist. In 1994 she achieved asylum and  Tula wrote Hear my testimony which documented her life and her views. The following year she moved to Minneapolis where she found a job in an electronics company.

Since the mid 1990s, she has worked for a twinning organisation, called COCODA, that pairs up communities in El Salvador with partner communities in the United States. Tula's is a member emerita of that organisation.

References

1951 births
Living people
Salvadoran human rights activists
Salvadoran women activists